The 2nd Central American and Caribbean Junior Championships was held in Xalapa, Mexico, on 26–29 August 1976.  The city was already the host of the inaugural CAC senior championships in May, 1967.

Although one website states:"Under 17 events were first included on the programme of the biennial Central American and Caribbean Junior Championships in 1978," another website displays also results for under-17 events in 1976.

Event summary
In the junior (U-20) category, Cuba won most gold medals (11), while host country Mexico was the overall leader in total medals (30).

In the under-20 men category, both Luis Alex Misiniak and David Giralt from Cuba won 3 golds (110m hurdles, 400m hurdles, 4 × 100 m relay) and (Long jump, Triple jump, 4 × 100 m relay), respectively.  Another Cuban fellow, Juan Martínez and Bahamian Rickey Moxey won two golds each (Shot put, Discus Throw) and (100m, 200m) respectively.

In the under-20 women category, Ileana Hocking from Puerto Rico, who won already a gold (1500m) and a silver medal (800m) at the 1974 championships in Maracaibo, Venezuela, gained a total of 5 medals, 4 golds (800m, 1500m, 4 × 100 m relay, 4 × 400 m relay) and one bronze (400m).  Ann Adams from Trinidad and Tobago gained 3 golds (100m, 200m, 100m hurdles), whereas Esther Vega from Puerto Rico won two golds (4 × 100 m relay, 4 × 400 m relay) and two silvers (400m, 100m hurdles), and Jennifer Swanston from Barbados won two golds (Long jump, Pentathlon).

Ernesto Canto from Mexico, future gold medallist in the men's 20 kilometre walk event at the 1984 Summer Olympics held in Los Angeles, California, defended his title and gained the gold medal in the 10,000 metres track walk event.  And María Caridad Colón from Cuba, future gold medallist in Javelin Throw at the 1980 Summer Olympics held in Moscow, Soviet Union, won gold in Javelin Throw and bronze in the Shot Put event.

Medal summary
Medal winners are published by category: Junior A, Male, and Junior A, Female.

Male Junior A (under 20)

Female Junior A (under 20)

Boys under 17 (Youth)

Girls under 17 (Youth)

Medal table (unofficial)

Participation (unofficial)

Detailed result lists can be found on the World Junior Athletics History website.   An unofficial count yields the number of about 127 athletes from about 11 countries:

 (8)
 (4)
 (2)
 (11)
 (3)
 (2)
 México (50)
 Panamá (1)
 (26)
 (11)
 (9)

References

External links
Official CACAC Website
World Junior Athletics History

Central American and Caribbean Junior Championships in Athletics
International athletics competitions hosted by Mexico
1976 in Mexican sports
Central American and Caribbean Junior Championships
1976 in youth sport